Kronos Quartet Performs Alfred Schnittke: The Complete String Quartets is a studio album by the Kronos Quartet. The double CD contains all four of Russian composer Alfred Schnittke's "startling" string quartets. String Quartet No.3 was recorded and released in 1988; the other three were recorded between 1994 and 1996 and released in 1998.

Track listing

Critical reception
The music of Alfred Schnittke became very popular in the United States in the 1990s, and the Kronos Quartet were among many "influential international figures" who played his music. They had recorded a Schnittke composition (String Quartet No.3) as early as 1988; all four of Schnittke's string quartets had been on the Kronos repertoire at least since 1991. Critics responded quite positively to this recording of the quartets. Lawrence Johnson, writing for the New York Times, said, "As the new Schnittke survey attests, the Kronos can play like demons. . . . The Kronos Quartet has delivered a performance in which every phrase is filled, if not with grief, with profound and resonant meaning." The album was nominated for Grammy Awards in two categories, "Best Classical Album" and "Best Chamber Music Performance."

Personnel

Musicians
David Harrington – violin
John Sherba – violin
Hank Dutt – viola
Joan Jeanrenaud – cello

Production
Recorded August 1994 – August 1996 at Skywalker Sound, Nicasio, California
Craig Silvey – Engineer
Chris Haynes – Assistant engineer (String Quartet No.1, "Canon")
Steve Limonoff – Assistant engineer (String Quartet No.2)
John Klepko – Assistant engineer (String Quartet No.4)
Jeanne Velonis – Editing assistance (String Quartet No.1 and String Quartet No.4, "Canon")
String Quartet No. 3 recorded November 1987 at Methuen Memorial Music Hall, Methuen, Massachusetts
John Newton – Engineer
Mastering of original release: Robert C. Ludwig
Previously released on Kronos Quartet, Winter Was Hard

See also
List of 1998 albums

References

1998 classical albums
Kronos Quartet albums
Nonesuch Records albums